The  is a skyscraper located in Marunouchi, Tokyo, Japan. Construction of the 205-metre tower was finished in 2007. The first fourteen floors of the building are occupied by a Daimaru department store.

References

External links

North Tower official site (Japanese)
South Tower official site (Japanese)

Buildings and structures completed in 2007
Marunouchi
Retail buildings in Tokyo
Buildings and structures in Chiyoda, Tokyo
Skyscraper office buildings in Tokyo
Skyscrapers in Tokyo
2007 establishments in Japan